Marl is the name of one of the electoral wards in the community of Conwy, Conwy County Borough, Wales. It elects representatives to Conwy County Borough Council and Conwy Town Council. The Marl ward covers part of the town of Llandudno Junction to the east of the River Conwy and is one of four county wards included within the boundaries of the community. The wards of Deganwy and Pensarn border Marl, also to the east of the river. Conwy ward lies on the opposite side of the river, including the walled town of Conwy. To the north of Marl is the Llandudno ward of Penrhyn.

According to the 2011 UK Census the population of the ward was 3,879.

County council elections
The ward elects two county councillors to Conwy County Borough Council and, at the May 2017 election, one seat was won by the Welsh Liberal Democrats and the other by the Welsh Labour Party. The Labour councillor, Mike Priestly, had previously represented the ward since 2004 as a Liberal Democrat. He had defected to the Labour Party in 2014 and, being a former trade union official, described it as "coming back to my roots". Local chiropodist Sue Shotter had won her seat from the Conservatives at a by-election in January 2011 and held it ever since.

2017

2012

* = sitting councillor prior to the election

2011 by-election
A by-election took place on Thursday 20 January 2011, after Conservative councillor Linda Hurr had stood down on health grounds.

Town Council elections
For the purposes of elections to Conwy Town Council, Marl ward elects or co-opts a total of four town councillors.

See also
 List of places in Conwy County Borough (categorised)

References

Conwy
Wards of Conwy County Borough